Heavensong: Music of Contemplation and Light is a compilation album released by the Mormon Tabernacle Choir and Orchestra at Temple Square.

The album reached topped the Billboard Classical albums chart.  The album features guest artists Igor Gruppman (track 10) and David Foster (track 13).  The album was recorded live in the Tabernacle in Salt Lake City on September 8–12, 2009.

Track listing

Charts

References

2010 albums
Tabernacle Choir compilation albums